The women's lyonnaise precision competition in boules sports at the 2017 World Games took place on 24 July 2017 at the Centennial Hall in Wrocław, Poland.

Competition format
A total of 8 athletes entered the competition. Top 4 athletes from qualification advances to the final.

Results

Qualification

Final

References 

 
2017 World Games